Daniel Micka (born 22 April 1963 in Prague) is a Czech writer and translator from English and French into Czech.

His stories have been published since 1992 in a range of Czech literary periodicals, later he has published three collections of his stories in a book form. The first book Overwhelmed by Love for Someone was published in 1996, and its sequel Fear of People in 2001. His next related collection Looking for Someone and Dreaming About Making Love to Them was released first in 2007 as an e-book and in a book form in 2011. His stories became the inspiration for two plays and some have been published in translation into Finnish, Dutch and Polish in foreign literary anthologies and magazines.

He translates books about philosophy, psychology and religion from various English-language authors, including Stuart Wilde, Norman Vincent Peale, Henryk Skolimowski, John N. Gray, Daniel A. Helminiak, Jeffrey Moussaieff Masson, Ian Buruma, David Benatar, Yosef Hayim Yerushalmi, Dambisa Moyo, Christopher Lasch, Harriet A. Washington, David Bakan, Dan Allender, Ronald Dworkin and others. The subject of several books he translated are views of Sigmund Freud and Otto Weininger. He has translated two books by Boris Cyrulnik from French into Czech. He has also translated films, documentaries and screenplays for Czechoslovak Television and the company Alfafilm.

Daniel Micka, in addition to writing prose now dedicates himself to translating from English and French into Czech for various publishers. He also works as a book editor.
He lives and works in Prague in the Czech Republic.

Works

Magazine articles 
Individual Micka's stories have been published since 1992 in
Tvar,
Literární noviny,
Vokno,
Iniciály,
Revolver Revue
etc.
literary magazines.

The supplement of Tvar – TVARy – also published a small collection of stories:
 Strach z lidí. [Fear of People.] Series TVARy, vol. 2. 1995. – 
 Hledání člověka. [Looking for Someone.] Series TVARy, vol. 19. 2004. –

Published books 
 Samou láskou člověka sníst. [Overwhelmed by Love for Someone.] Brno: Petrov. 1996. .
 – A collection of twenty three short stories expressing the feelings of a lonely man who finds the courage to approach people but looks for his place in life in vain; the main theme of these stories is finally death and the indifference to others and their indifference to the individual.
 Strach z lidí. [Fear of People.] Brno: Petrov. 2001. .
 – A collection of forty two stories on various themes linked by the feeling of the rootlessness and groping of a man – his embarrassment over his life and interpersonal relations, his fear of other people; the book is in stark contrast to the first but is in fact a continuation.
 Hledání člověka a sny o milování se s ním. [Looking for Someone and Dreaming About Making Love to Them.] Praha : dybbuk. 2011. .
 E-book: Hledání člověka a sny o milování se s ním [E-kniha]. Praha : dybbuk, 2011. 144 pages (PDF). EAN EK167551. – revised edition
 The book was originally published as an e-book: Hledání člověka a sny o milování se s ním. Praha (e-book): dybbuk. 2007. (Beletrie; vol. 05.)
 – The next collection of short stories is based on extraordinary experiences of the narrator, who appears in them in a range of unusual forms but in an unchangeable role; the literary and existential testimony of an individual looking for someone and dreaming about making love to them.

Published in anthologies 
 "Exkurse" (in Czech). in Kopáč, Radim; Jirkalová, Karolína; et al. (eds.) (2004). Antologie nové české literatury 1995–2004. [Anthology of New Czech Literature 1995–2004.] Praha: Fra. pp. 209–213. .

Translated into foreign languages 
 
 
  Available online – three stories from the book Strach z lidí [Fear of People] (2001).
  Available online – three stories from the book Samou láskou člověka sníst [Overwhelmed by Love for Someone] (1996).
 —— (2005). Translated by Barbara Kudaj. "W poszukiwaniu człowieka". Czeskie Revue (Racibórz-Ostróg) [online] (in Polish). Available online (archived link) – three stories from the collection Hledání člověka [Looking for Someone] (2004).

Translations from English into Czech 
 Wilde, Stuart (1994). Kormidluj svůj člun. [Affirmations.] Praha: Erika, Petra. .
 Peale, Norman Vincent (1996). Síla pozitivního žití. [The Power of Positive Living.] Praha: Pragma, Knižní klub. , .
 Baker, Stephen (1997). Jak žít s neurotickou kočkou. [How to Live with a Neurotic Cat.] Praha: Pragma. .
 Skolimowski, Henryk (2001). Účastná mysl : nová teorie poznání a vesmíru. [The Participatory Mind : A New Theory of Knowledge and of the Universe.] Praha: Mladá fronta. .
 Gray, John (2004). Dvě tváře liberalismu. [Two Faces of Liberalism.] Praha: Mladá fronta. .
 Helminiak, Daniel A. (2004). Ježíš Kristus : kým byl/je doopravdy. [The Same Jesus : A Contemporary Christology.] Praha: Práh. .
 Jampolsky, Gerald G. (2004). Léčivá moc lásky : sedm principů atitudálního léčení. [Teach Only Love : The Seven Principles of Attitudinal Healing.] Praha: Pragma. .
 White, Gregory L.; Mullen, Paul E. (2006). Žárlivost : teorie, výzkum a klinické strategie. [Jealousy : Theory, Research, and Clinical Strategies.] Praha: Triton. .
 Helminiak, Daniel A. (2007). Co vlastně Bible říká o homosexualitě? [What the Bible Really Says About Homosexuality.] Brno: Centrum pro studium demokracie a kultury (CDK). .
 Masson, Jeffrey Moussaieff (2007). Útok na pravdu : Freudovo potlačení teorie svádění. [The Assault on Truth : Freud's Suppression of the Seduction Theory.] Praha: Mladá fronta. .
 Slipp, Samuel (2007). Freudovská mystika : Freud, ženy a feminismus. [The Freudian Mystique : Freud, Women, and Feminism.] Praha: Triton. .
 Wolff, Larry (2007). Týrání a zneužívání dětí ve Vídni v době Freuda (korespondenční lístky z konce světa). [Child Abuse in Freud's Vienna : Postcards from the End of the World.] Praha: Triton. .
 Dreger, Alice Domurat (2009). Hermafroditi a medicínská konstrukce pohlaví. [Hermaphrodites and the Medical Invention of Sex.] Praha: Triton. .
 Sengoopta, Chandak (2009). Otto Weininger : sexualita a věda v císařské Vídni. [Otto Weininger : Sex, Science, and Self in Imperial Vienna.] Praha: Academia. .
 Kushner, Howard I. (2011). Tourettův syndrom. [A Cursing Brain? : The Histories of Tourette syndrome.] Praha: Triton. .
 Buruma, Ian (2012). Krocení bohů : Náboženství a demokracie na třech kontinentech. [Taming the Gods : Religion and Democracy on Three Continents.] Praha: Academia. .
 Benatar, David (2013). Nebýt či být : O utrpení, které přináší příchod na tento svět. [Better Never to Have Been : The Harm of Coming into Existence.] Praha: Dybbuk. .
 Yerushalmi, Yosef Hayim (2015). Freudův Mojžíš : Judaismus konečný a nekonečný. [Freud's Moses : Judaism Terminable and Interminable.] Praha: Academia. .
 Smith, Jeffrey M. (2015). Doba jedová 5 : Geneticky modifikované potraviny. [Genetic Roulette : The Documented Health Risks of Genetically Engineered Foods.] Praha: Stanislav Juhaňák–Triton. .
 Moyo, Dambisa (2015). Kterak Západ zbloudil : 50 let ekonomického bláznovství – a neúprosná rozhodnutí, která nás čekají. [How the West Was Lost : Fifty Years of Economic Folly – And the Stark Choices that Lie Ahead.] Praha: Academia. .
 Lasch, Christopher (2016): Kultura narcismu : Americký život ve věku snižujících se očekávání. [The Culture of Narcissism : American Life in an Age of Diminishing Expectations.] Praha: Stanislav Juhaňák–Triton. .
 Phillips, Anita (2016): Obrana masochismu. [A Defence of Masochism.] Praha: Volvox Globator. .
 Wolynn, Mark (2017): Trauma : nechtěné dědictví : jak nás formuje zděděné rodinné trauma a jak je překonat. [It Didn't Start with You : How Inherited Family Trauma Shapes Who We Are and How to End the Cycle.] Praha: Stanislav Juhaňák–Triton. .
 Washington, Harriet A. (2017): Doba jedová 8 : Infekční šílenství : Vakcíny, antibiotika, autismus, schizofrenie, viry. [Infectious madness : The Surprising Science of How We "Catch" Mental Illness.] Praha: Stanislav Juhaňák–Triton. .
 Bollinger, Ty M. (2017): Pravda o rakovině : Vše, co potřebujete vědět o historii, léčbě a prevenci této zákeřné nemoci. [The Truth about Cancer : What You Need to Know about Cancer's History, Treatment, and Prevention.] Praha: Dobrovský s.r.o., Omega. .
 Bakan, David (2017): Sigmund Freud a židovská mystická tradice. [Sigmund Freud and the Jewish Mystical Tradition.] Praha: Volvox Globator. .
 Allender, Dan B. (2018): Léčba zraněného srdce : Bolest ze sexuálního zneužití a naděje na proměnu. [Healing the Wounded Heart : The Heartache of Sexual Abuse and the Hope of Transformation.] Praha: Stanislav Juhaňák–Triton. .
 Mace, Nancy L; Rabins, Peter V. (2018): Alzheimer : Rodinný průvodce péčí o nemocné s Alzheimerovou chorobou a jinými demencemi : ztráta paměti, změny chování a nálad, jak vydržet v roli ošetřovatele, každodenní péče o blízké s demencí či ztrátou paměti. [The 36-Hour Day : A Family Guide to Caring for People Who Have Alzheimer Disease, Other Dementias, and Memory Loss.] Praha: Stanislav Juhaňák–Triton. .
 Rooney, Anne (2018): Příběh psychologie : Od duchů k psychoterapii: naše mysl v průběhu věků. [The Story of Psychology : From Spirits to Psychotherapy: Tracing the Mind Through the Ages.] Praha: Dobrovský s.r.o., Omega. .
 Perry, Gina (2019): Ztracení chlapci : Kontroverzní psychologický experiment Muzafera Sherifa ve Státním parku Robbers Cave. [The Lost Boys : Inside Muzafer Sherif's Robbers Cave Experiment.] Praha: Stanislav Juhaňák–Triton. .
 Dworkin, Ronald M. (2021): Náboženství bez Boha. [Religion Without God.] Praha: Dybbuk. .
 Cohen, David (2022): Freud na koksu. [Freud on Coke.] Praha: Malvern. .

Awards and nominations
 Translation of the book Chandak Sengoopta Otto Weininger, Sex, Science, and Self in Imperial Vienna was nominated for the Academia Publishing House Prize for the translation of scientific or non-fiction work in 2009.

Translations from French into Czech 
 Cyrulnik, Boris (2020): Když si dítě sáhne na život. (Child Suicide.) [Quand un enfant se donne « la mort ».] Praha: Stanislav Juhaňák–Triton. .
 Cyrulnik, Boris (2020): V noci jsem psal o slunci: Psaní jako prostředek terapie. (At Night, I Would Write Suns.) [La nuit, j'écrirai des soleils.] Praha: Stanislav Juhaňák–Triton. .

Literature 
 Wernisch, Ivan (1994). Pekařova noční nůše. Brno: Petrov. p. 129. .
 Machala, Lubomír (1996). Průvodce po nových jménech české poezie a prózy 1990–1995. Olomouc: Rubico. pp. 27, 107. .

References

External links 

 Czech Literature Portal (archived link) – about the author, excerpts from his work in Czech
 Petrov publishing house (archived link) – excerpts from the work in Czech
 Czeskie Revue – three stories from the collection Looking for Someone in Polish
 Tijdschrift voor Slavische Literatuur 48 – three stories from the book Fear of People in Dutch
 Tijdschrift voor Slavische Literatuur 63 – three stories from the book Overwhelmed by Love for Someone in Dutch

1963 births
Living people
Writers from Prague
Czech male writers
Czech translators
English–Czech translators
French–Czech translators